The Parish Church of St Peter and St Paul in Witton Lane, Aston, Birmingham, England, is a parish church in the Church of England.

Background

The origin of Aston and its parish church is uncertain. A 2013 archaeological excavation on the site of the original village suggests there was a British Roman settlement. The Doomsday Surveyor (1086) gave Aston (Estone) 5 times the value of nearby Birmingham. Aston Hall was constructed in 1618. The area was wealthy during the agricultural era. It was overtaken with Birmingham’s rising wealth from industrialisation. During the 19th century the area became residential and industrial. Generally the area prospered until the slum clearances in 1960s, the construction of the A38(M) and the collapse of British industry in the last quarter of the 20th century. Aston is now one of the most deprived areas in the UK.

The church is in the Aston Hall and Church Conservation Area and is located between the A38(M) and Villa Park, the home of Aston Villa Football Club.
The building is grade II* listed.

History

During the period of the Heptarchy, Aston was part of the Kingdom of Mercia, and documentary evidence from this period is scarce. The church was probably started in the 9th century. The original building would have been wooden and this was recorded in the Doomsday Survey. The Parish was huge. There were chapels of ease in Yardley, Water Orton and Castle Bromwich. It would have been impossible for these to be serviced by one priest and it is probable that Ss Peter & Paul was a minster church. 

The first masonry structure was completed in 1120. It was the 2nd largest church in the West Midlands, the original Coventry cathedral was larger. There was a major reordering in 1480. The tower and spire remain from this church although the spire was renovated by John Cheshire (1776 – 77).

The Church was again reordered in 1879. The architect was JA Chatwin a Birmingham architect who  specialised in both Neo-Gothic and Neo-Classical styles.
In recent years the building has been subject to gentle change the most noticeable intervention was in 2008 when a masonry platform was constructed incorporating a unique cruciform immersion baptistry.

Notable monuments 

The church has many high quality monuments dating from 1360 to 2018. These include 3 chest tombs commemorating the Arden family who were ancestors of William Shakespeare. There is also a Shakespeare window.
 
Two tombs are associated with the Wars of the Roses. The effigy of William Harcourt (d. 1483) wears English armour. Sir Thomas De Erdington (d. 1449) is another fine memorial: Sir Thomas gave his name to the Erdington district of Birmingham.

There is a 19th-century bust commemorating John Rogers. Born in Aston in 1500 he was burnt at the stake in 1555. His crime was that he was responsible for the Matthew Bible, the first translation of the complete Bible from the original Greek into English. The King James is the best known edition of the Matthew Bible.

The most recent monument was installed in 2019 to commemorate the lives of Charlene Ellis (18), and Letisha Shakespeare (17) who were killed in a drive-by shooting in the early hours of 2 January 2003. The community was outraged, and led by the girls' mothers there is an ongoing crusade against gun and knife crime. The mosaic monument was originally installed at St George's School in Newtown and was moved to the church when the school closed. The community was involved in the construction of this monument.

The brass eagle lectern is a memorial to Joseph Ansell, founder of Ansells Brewery, who was churchwarden from 1867 to 1883. The memorial was manufactured by Jones and Willis, a notable Aston firm specialising in church furnishings.

There are some outstanding windows from the Victorian period. The recently renovated Plevins window in the south aisle depicts 4 episodes from the nativity story.

Organ

The church had a 3 manual pipe organ.  The original pipe organ was mounted in the tower of the 1480 church. It was replaced by the present organ that is located to the north of the chancel. The manufacturer was Banfield in 1901. It was  rebuilt by Nicholson in 1967 with electric bellows and additional stops.

List of organists

Thomas F Thomason c. 1912

Churchyard

The churchyard is closed to burials and maintenance is the responsibility of Birmingham City Council. It was partly cleared in the 1950s as a memorial to Rt Rev Henry McGowen a former vicar. Some parts are overgrown. Notable monuments are 

31 Commonwealth war grave memorials 
Alfred Wilcox VC (north of the church)
The Ansell family vault, (north east of the church)
Henry Johnson (1809–1890) (south of the church) was erected by the ‘Bell Ringers of England’ to commemorate his work creating the Central Council of Church Bellringers.
The Aston War Memorial dedicated as a peace memorial in 1921 a grade 2 listed structure south west of the church.

References

External links 

 Aston WW1 Memorial Project

Grade II* listed buildings in Birmingham
Grade II* listed churches in the West Midlands (county)
Church of England church buildings in Birmingham, West Midlands